Gandevi is one of the 182 Legislative Assembly constituencies of Gujarat state in India. It is part of Navsari district and is reserved for candidates belonging to the Scheduled Tribes.

List of areas
This assembly seat represents the following segments

 Gandevi Taluka (Part) Villages – Duwada, Vadsangal, Rahej, Sarikhurd, Saribujrang, Torangam, Khergam, Deshad, Kalvach, Ambheta, Pati, Valoti, Devdha, Chhapar, Mendhar, Morali, Kalamtha, Bhatha, Dhakwada, Kesali, Nandarkha, Vaghrech, Bigri, Govandi Bhathala, Vangam, Khaparwada, Undach Luhar Faliya, Undach Vaniya Faliya, Gandevi (CT), Devsar (CT), Talodh, Bilimora (M), Antaliya (CT).
 Chikhli Taluka (Part) Villages – Nogama, Saraiya, Chitali, Bodvank, Tankal, Minkachchh, Barolia, Sunthwad, Degam, Chasa, Vanzna, Undhwal, Rethvania, Alipor, Khundh, Thala, Samaroli, Majigam, Ghekti, Vankal, Hond, Malwada, Sadakpor, Pipalgabhan, Talavchora, Balwada, Tejlav, Maliadhara, Soldhara, Pananj, Vad, Ghej, Chari, Vav, Debarpada, Ruzvani, Khergam, Naranpor, Nandhai, Bhervi, Peladi Bhervi, Bahej, Chimanpada, Chikhli (CT), Achhavani, Jamanpada, Gauri, Vadpada.

Members of Legislative Assembly

Election results

2022

2017

2012

See also
 List of constituencies of the Gujarat Legislative Assembly
 Navsari district

References

External links
 

Assembly constituencies of Gujarat
Navsari district